Leonidas Pantelides (born 11 January 1953, in Nicosia) is the former Ambassador Extraordinary and Plenipotentiary of the Republic of Cyprus to Sweden, Greece and Russia.
Since June 27, 2016 he is Cypriot Ambassador to the United States of America.

In 2004 Pantelides published a philosophical book in Greek titled Eudemos (About Time).

References 

Cypriot diplomats
Living people
Ambassadors of Cyprus to Russia
Ambassadors of Cyprus to Sweden
Ambassadors of Cyprus to Greece
1953 births
Ambassadors of Cyprus to the United States